Woodland is a census-designated place (CDP) in Summit County, Utah, United States. The population was 335 at the 2000 census.

Woodland was first settled in 1874.

Geography

Demographics

As of the census of 2000, there were 335 people, 98 households, and 83 families residing in the CDP. The population density was 144.0 people per square mile (/km2). There were 115 housing units at an average density of 49.4/sq mi (/km2). The racial makeup of the CDP was 98.51% White, and 1.49% from two or more races. Hispanic or Latino of any race were 3.28% of the population.

There were 98 households, out of which 51.0% had children under the age of 18 living with them, 73.5% were married couples living together, 7.1% had a female householder with no husband present, and 15.3% were non-families. 11.2% of all households were made up of individuals, and 5.1% had someone living alone who was 65 years of age or older. The average household size was 3.42 and the average family size was 3.75.

In the CDP, the population was spread out, with 37.0% under the age of 18, 8.4% from 18 to 24, 23.6% from 25 to 44, 24.8% from 45 to 64, and 6.3% who were 65 years of age or older. The median age was 32 years. For every 100 females, there were 97.1 males. For every 100 females age 18 and over, there were 104.9 males.

The median income for a household in the CDP was $53,750, and the median income for a family was $54,000. Males had a median income of $36,250 versus $30,000 for females. The per capita income for the CDP was $25,392. None of the families and 1.0% of the population were living below the poverty line, including no under eighteens and none of those over 64.

Education
It is in the South Summit School District.

See also

 List of census-designated places in Utah

References

External links

Populated places established in 1874
Census-designated places in Summit County, Utah
1874 establishments in Utah Territory
Census-designated places in Utah
Salt Lake City metropolitan area